The fourth Sarawak state election was held between Wednesday, 28 December and Thursday, 29 December 1983 with a nomination date on Thursday, 8 December 1983. The two-day duration of the election was shorter than the eight-day election in 1979 state election because of improvements in transportation and communication systems. Only 45 out of 48 seats were contested. The state assembly was dissolved on 18 November 1983 by the governor of Sarawak with the advice of chief minister of Sarawak, which was one year and 15 days earlier than the expiration of the state assembly on 3 December 1984.

The election was held during the peak of monsoon season. This election saw 505,872 registered voters eligible to vote, with 367,060 voters (72.56%) actually casting their votes. In this election, Sarawak Barisan Nasional (BN) fielded candidates for 32 seats, SNAP for 18 seats, PBDS for 14 seats, Democratic Action Party (DAP) for 7 seats, and Sarawak Democratik Bersatu (BERSATU) for 4 seats. There were 80 independents contesting for the seats.

Background

The leadership crisis of Sarawak National Party (SNAP, a component party of BN) has caused the emergence of an offshoot party named Parti Bansa Dayak Sarawak (PBDS). However, chief minister Abdul Taib Mahmud decided to accept PBDS into the BN coalition. This has caused dissatisfaction of SNAP leadership towards Taib. Both parties SNAP and PBDS were unwilling to compromise any of their seats. Therefore, Taib decided to allow SNAP and PBDS to compete against each other by under their respective party symbols. Serious competitions occurred in state constituencies contested by PBDS and SNAP. Generally, this election was carried out in a peaceful and orderly manner except for the clashes between PBDS candidate and the election officials in N 35 Machan constituency. Sarawak BN, composed of Parti Pesaka Bumiputera Bersatu (PBB) and Sarawak United Peoples' Party (SUPP), won 29 seats on the election day. They later accepted SNAP and PBDS into the coalition, thus securing a total of 44 of 48 seats.

Results

Summary

Results by constituency 
The full list of representatives is shown below:

Three seats were won uncontested by Barisan Nasional (BN):
N24. Matu Daro won by Wahab Haji Dollah
N32. Oya won by Haji Salleh Jafaruddin
N44. Miri won by Dr George Chan Hong Nam

See also
 List of Malaysian State Assembly Representatives (1982–1986)

References

1983
1983 elections in Malaysia